Bombah Gulf is a protected area of Libya, which covers 1065 km².

References

Protected areas of Libya